WMPZ (93.5 FM) is a commercial radio station located in Harrison, Tennessee, broadcasting to the Chattanooga, Tennessee area. WMPZ airs an urban adult contemporary music format branded as "G93", and is owned by Brewer Media. Its studios are located just south of downtown Chattanooga, and its transmitter is located in Red Bank.

WMPZ's previous formats included Urban Oldies, Gospel, & Smooth Jazz. 

On January 4, 2022, the station rebranded as "G93" and replaced the syndicated Tom Joyner Morning Show, which it had carried for more than a decade, with The Rickey Smiley Morning Show.

References

External links
WMPZ official website

MPZ
Urban adult contemporary radio stations in the United States